Procrimima viridis is a moth in the subfamily Arctiinae. It was described by Druce in 1906. It is found in Peru and Brazil.

References

Natural History Museum Lepidoptera generic names catalog

Moths described in 1906
Lithosiini